A khurul ( or hure or küriye) is a Buddhist monastery (temple, abode) in Kalmyk (Mongol-Oirat) Lamaism.

Etymology and morphology

Among Kalmyks and Tuvians, the term khurul (хурул) is the common name for Buddhist monasteries and temples in Kalmykia, Tuva, Mongolia, and Buryatia, though, they have been renamed to datsan in the latter. The word khurul derives from the Mongolian word khure (хурэ), which means "circle", "ring", "inclosure", and/or from the Mongolian word khural (хурал) which means "assembly" or "religious service", in a more religious context. The reference to "circles" is explained by the ancient custom of the nomadic people to form circles with their yurts during their stops, with the yurt of the leader being in the center. This formation served a protective purpose in case of a sudden enemy attack. Later, this formation became the standard planning concept for those monasteries.

There are different types of Buddhist monasteries in the Mongolian tradition: khure, sum, and khiid. In her study "Decor in the architecture of Buryat Buddhist temples", Bardanova states that the differentiation of Mongolian monastery types was based on the number of lamas and the status of the institution. Asalkhanova, on the other hand, distingushes them based on layout and location.

Khure - large monasteries, at which the clergy lived permanently. They are located in the steppe and were built in the form of a circle. Ikh-khure, the residence of the Bogd Gegeen, used to be the largest nomadic Khalkha monastery, which later settled and grew to the size of a city (now: the capital of Mongolia - Ulaanbaatar). Rinchen used the term "monastic city" to describe khure.
Sum or Sume or Syume - a small, specialized temple, the laity of which does not live at the site of the temple constantly, gathering only on major holidays; or a separate temple in a large monastery. They are usually dedicated to particular individuals of the Buddhist pantheon and contain sculptures of said idividual. In Kalmykia, these sculptures tend to be made out of wood, while in Buryatia it's common to use wood or metal. Rinchen refers to sum as "temple".
Khiid or Khit - literally: "lonely abode" - are monasteries that are situated on the slopes of high mountains and similarly difficult topographical reliefs. For example, Manjusri Khiid on the south slope of Bogd Khan Mountain and Tövkhön Khiid on the Shireet Ulaan Uul mountain. Khiid are hermitage-like monastries that are meant for retreats. Rinchen uses the word "monastery" for khiid.

In pre-revolutionary Mongolia, monasteries were most often assigned, as part of their names, the type that characterized them at the time of construction, regardless of current social realities. Nowadays, only khiid in the meaning of "monastery" and sum in the meaning of "temple" are used. In the Russian regions of the settlement of the Mongolian peoples, aside from khurul, the following nomenclature was entrenched and in parts modified in its meaning:

Datsan (from ) - in Tibet, originally refers to a department, a faculty at a large monastery, where tsannid studies are conducted, or a temple with priveleged rights. Among the Buryats, the word has the meaning of "Buddhist monastery" in general. Whereas for Mongols, a datsan is a separate temple attached to a large monastery, not necessarily associated with the educational process. Datsans in Buryatia have the same circular layout as khure.
 ( from  - "assembly hall") - a "eukterion" or "shrine" in the understanding of Buryats and Mongols. In Buryatia the word is used interchangeably with sume, i.e. "temple". It refers to separate buildings, which are attached to a monastery (or are separate temples) and are dedicated to particular deities (e.g., the Medicine Buddha) and/or a particular purpose (e.g., medical studies).

Background

Initially, Buddhism and khuruls were promoted and founded by the lama, and Zaya Pandita, the inventor of Kalmyk writing.

The choice of construction and the place of laying the foundation of khuruls was and still is made by Buddhist monks. In the center of the base of the pit, a sword, a bowl of rice (arshan - alms to the Buddhist gods), and many paper rolls with Buddhist prayers are placed. The set-up is similar to the ceremony of construction  and ascension of Buddhist stupas.

Historically, khuruls played an important role in the spiritual and cultural lives of Kalmyks. The monasteries were not only meant as a place of worship, but also as an institution of learning where people would study the Dharma and Indo-Tibetan medicine. Sacred Buddhist texts, books on medicine, and fine ritual accessories were kept in khuruls. A lot of books were imported from Tibet, China, and Mongolia.

With the raise of communism and Stalin's rule, many khuruls were closed, repurposed (e.g., as kindergartens), or even destroyed, due to the ideological struggle against religion. Buryatiya had 34 datsans by 1846, but by 1935 about one third of them were emptied because the clergy fled or was repressed. One year later, more than two thirds of all Buryatian datsans were closed, and the lamas expelled based on accusations of treason and espionage. In Kalmykia, 79 khuruls were closed down between the years 1917 and 1937. Tuva, as an "independent" state since 1921, was spared until 1929, but then the Communist Party started to systematically arrest lamas and monks. A lot of khuruls in Tuva and Kalmykia were burned down. It wasn't until the 1940s that the repression eased, and a new Buddhist temple - Ivolginsky Datsan - was built in the Ivolginsky District, in Buryatia. Restorations of destroyed temples and constructions of new temples began in the period of Perestroika. Nowadays, there are about 22 khuruls in Kalmykia, 16 in Tuva, and more than 30 in Buryatya. Some Buddhist centers can also be found in big cities like Moscow and Saint-Petersburg.

List of khuruls and sumes

Kalmykia
Elista
Burkhan Bakshin Altan Sume
Geden Sheddup Choikorling Monastery 

Gorodovikovsk

Iki-Burulsky District
Iki-Burulsky Khurul "Orgyen Samye Ling"
Baga-Burulsky Khurul
Khomutnikovsky Khurul "Tashi Lkhunpo" (Таши Лхунпо) (ruins)
Orgakinsky Khurul "Bogdo Dalai Lamin Rashi Lunpo"

Ketchenerovsky District
Altsyn-Khutinsky Khurul
Godzhursky Khurul
Sarpinsky Khurul "Sera Tosam Ling"
Shin Mer Khurul

Lagansky District

Ulankholsky Tsagan-Khurul

Lagansky Khurul
Galsan Khurul in Dzhalykovo

Maloderbetovsky District
Maloderbetovsky Khurul

Oktyabrsky District

Tashi Gomang

Priyutnensky District

Sarpinsky District
Arshan-Zelmensky Iki-Khurul

Tselinny District

Khar-Buluksky Khurul "Bogdokhinsky"
Troitsky 
Nayntakinovsky Khurul

Baga-Chonosovsky Khurul

Chernozemelsky District
Tsekertinsky Khurul in the village of Burovoy
Komsomolsky Khurul
Arteziansky Khurul
Adykovsky Khurul

Yustinsky District

Tsagan Amansky Khurul "Tugmyud-gavdzhi"

Yashaltinsky District
Yashaltinsky Khurul (in construction) 

Yashkulsky District]
Yashkulsky Khurul

Tuva

Buryatia

Ulan-Ude Datsan Khambyn Khure / Hambyn-Hure Datsan

Astrakhan Oblast
 
 (used to be on the territory of the Kalmyk AO / Kalmyk ASSR but is now located in Astrakhan Oblast, just like the above one)

See also
Datsan
Buddhism in Kalmykia
Buddhism in Buryatia
Buddhism in Tuva
Buddhism in Russia

References 

Buddhist monasteries in Russia
Gelug monasteries
Buddhism in Kalmykia
Buddhist temples in Russia
Tibetan Buddhism
Religious buildings and structures

ru:Хурул